The Locus Award for Best Novelette is one of a series of Locus Awards given annually by Locus Magazine. Awards presented in a given year are for works published in the previous calendar year.

The first award in this category was presented in 1975.

Winners
Winners are as follows:

References

Novelette
Short story awards